Augustus Loring Rhodes (May 25, 1821 – October 23, 1918) was the 10th Chief Justice of California.

Biography
Educated at Hamilton College, Rhodes studied law and then moved to Bloomfield, Indiana, being admitted to the bar there in 1846. He served one term as the prosecuting attorney for the circuit court (1849), and departed for California in 1854. Settling in San Jose, he became district attorney in 1859 and then State Senator for the 4th district in 1860.

In 1863, a constitutional amendment meant all of the seats of the Supreme Court of California were open for election. In October 1863, Rhodes was elected to the Supreme Court of California, and served from January 2, 1864, until 1880. He served as the 10th Chief Justice from 1870 to 1872. His first term expired January 1, 1872, and the Court referred the issue of whether he would continue to serve as Chief Justice to a panel of three San Francisco attorneys. They decided that Article 6, Section 3, of the 1862 state Constitution required the justice with the shortest remaining term to serve, and so Royal Sprague replaced Rhodes as chief justice.  In October 1871, Rhodes was elected to a ten-year term. A new Constitution adopted in 1879 required elections for all Supreme Court positions. In 1879, he ran for Chief Justice but lost to Robert F. Morrison.

From 1899 to 1907, he served as a Superior Court judge in Santa Clara County. The vacancy on the trial bench caused by Rhodes's retirement (at the age of 88) was filled by John E. Richards.

Rhodes remained active to an advanced age; he gave an address at the annual convention of the California Bar Association in June 1918, four months before his death at the age of 97.

Personal life
On September 30, 1846, Rhodes married Elizabeth Greene Cavins (April 7, 1829 – December 25, 1901), a judge's daughter in Greene County, Indiana. They had six children: Mary Rhodes (Barstow) (born 1848), who married the son of her father's law partner; James H. Rhodes (born 1849); Samuel R. Rhodes (born 1854), who became a doctor; Margaret Rhodes (1857-1870); Edward Livingston Rhodes (1860-1945), who joined his father's law firm of Rhodes & Barstow after graduating from the University of California, Berkeley, and later served as a justice of the peace in Chino, California; and Augusta E. Rhodes (born 1868).

References

External links
 Augustus L. Rhodes. California Supreme Court Historical Society. Retrieved July 18, 2017.
 Past & Present Justices. California State Courts. Retrieved July 19, 2017.

See also
 List of justices of the Supreme Court of California
 John Currey
 Silas Sanderson
 Lorenzo Sawyer
 Oscar L. Shafter

1821 births
1918 deaths
People from Oneida County, New York
People from Bloomfield, Indiana
People from San Jose, California
U.S. state supreme court judges admitted to the practice of law by reading law
Justices of the Supreme Court of California
Chief Justices of California
19th-century American judges
20th-century American judges
Superior court judges in the United States
District attorneys in California
Republican Party California state senators
Indiana lawyers